Denis Yakhno (born 20 November 1992) is a Belarusian professional footballer who plays for Bumprom Gomel.

External links
 
 
 Profile at Gomel website

1992 births
Living people
Belarusian footballers
Association football midfielders
FC Gomel players
FC Gorodeya players
FC Lokomotiv Gomel players
FC Osipovichi players
FC Sputnik Rechitsa players
FC Khimik Svetlogorsk players